Original Love (オリジナル・ラブ) is a Japanese music band and project by Takao Tajima. The band was formed in 1986 with four members, but since 1995 they have been a solo project for Takao Tajima.

They were nominated in the 1994 MTV Video Music Awards for the International Viewer's Choice Award for MTV Japan category.

They released a song titled "Happy Birthday Song"  on April 24, 2018. They released their 18th album on February 12, 2019.

Their song "Seppun"  was covered by Mika Nakashima in 2003.

References

External links 
 

Japanese musical groups
Japanese musicians